American Dream, Global Nightmare is a book by Ziauddin Sardar and Merryl Wyn Davies (Icon Books, 2004). It presents the neoconservative ideology of Pax Americana as ten laws.

References

2004 non-fiction books
Books about foreign relations of the United States
Books about politics of the United States
Books about neoconservatism
Criticism of neoconservatism
History books about the 21st century